Douglas R. Belden (April 24, 1927 – July 8, 1972) was an American player of Canadian football who was a quarterback for the Regina and Saskatchewan Roughriders of the Canadian Football League (CFL).  He attended the University of Florida in Gainesville, Florida, where he played for the Florida Gators football team from 1945 to 1948.  He also played baseball and basketball for the Gators.  He was later inducted into the University of Florida Athletic Hall of Fame as a "Gator Great."

Belden was drafted by the Chicago Cardinals in the 27th round of the 1948 NFL Draft.

See also
 List of University of Florida Athletic Hall of Fame members

References

External links
Just Sports Stats
Fanbase profile

1927 births
1972 deaths
Baseball players from Tampa, Florida
Basketball players from Tampa, Florida
Players of American football from Tampa, Florida
Players of Canadian football from Tampa, Florida
American football quarterbacks
Canadian football quarterbacks
American players of Canadian football
Florida Gators football players
Florida Gators baseball players
Florida Gators men's basketball players
Saskatchewan Roughriders players
American men's basketball players